The gens Lemonia was an ancient but obscure family at Rome.  Hardly any members of this gens are known, and the name might be entirely forgotten, were it not for the fact that the Lemonii gave their name to one of the Servian tribes.  This dates the family to at least the middle of the sixth century BC, when they may have been major landholders in the region later known as the pagus Lemonius, but none of the Lemonii are known to have held any magistracies over the history of the Republic.  A few Lemonii are known from inscriptions; a family of this name lived in Venetia and Histria.

Members

 Lucius Lemonius, buried at Aquileia in Venetia and Histria.
 Lucius Lemonius T. f., built a tomb near Patavium in Venetia and Histria for a certain Pittiaca Primula.
 Quintus Lemonius Sex. f., named in an inscription from Julia Concordia in Venetia and Histria.
 Gaius Lemonius C. f. Mollo, buried at Patavium.

See also
 List of Roman gentes

References

Bibliography
 Theodor Mommsen et alii, Corpus Inscriptionum Latinarum (The Body of Latin Inscriptions, abbreviated CIL), Berlin-Brandenburgische Akademie der Wissenschaften (1853–present).
 René Cagnat et alii, L'Année épigraphique (The Year in Epigraphy, abbreviated AE), Presses Universitaires de France (1888–present).
 Fulviomario Broilo, Iscrizioni Lapidarie Latine del Museo Nazionale Concordiese di Portogruaro (I a.C. – III d.C.) (Latin Lapidary Inscriptions from the National Museum of Concordia at Portogruaro, 1st century BC – 3rd century AD, abbreviated ILLConcordia), Bretschneider, Rome (1980–1984).
 Giovanni Battista Brusin, Inscriptiones Aquileiae (Inscriptions of Aquileia, abbreviated InscrAqu), Udine (1991–1993).
 Timothy J. Cornell, The Beginnings of Rome: Italy and Rome from the Bronze Age to the Punic Wars (c. 1000–264 BC), Routledge, London (1995).

Roman gentes